Sir Alexander Cray Grant, 8th Baronet (13 November 1782 – 29 November 1854) was a British politician and plantation owner in the West Indies.

Life

He was born in 1782 in West Alvington, Devon, the eldest son of Sir Alexander Grant, 7th Baronet and Sarah Cray. He graduated from St John's College, Cambridge in 1806 with a Master of Arts (MA). He entered politics in Jamaica, where he owned two plantations, as a member of the Jamaican colonial assembly from 1810 to 1811. In 1812, he returned to England, where he successfully stood as a Tory Member of Parliament for Tregony in the House of Commons. In 1818, he was elected as MP for Lostwithiel, and was re-elected there in June 1826, although he was also elected to Aldborough which he chose to represent instead. From 1826 to 1831, Grant was the Chairman of Ways and Means in the House of Commons. He was unsuccessful in elections for Grimsby in 1835, and Honiton, but re-entered the House representing Cambridge in 1840, until 1843. In 1843 he was appointed a Commissioner of Audit, remaining in that office until the end of his life.

Grant succeeded his father as Baronet of Dalvey upon the latter's death in 1825. Grant himself died in London on 29 November 1854 aged 72, and was succeeded in the baronetcy by his brother, Robert Innes Grant.

Grant received over £12,000 in compensation for the emancipation of his slaves from estates in Jamaica in 1838.

He was uncle to Sir Alexander Grant FRSE 10th baronet of Dalvey.

References

External links 
 

1782 births
1854 deaths
Baronets in the Baronetage of Nova Scotia
UK MPs 1812–1818
UK MPs 1818–1820
UK MPs 1820–1826
UK MPs 1826–1830
UK MPs 1830–1831
UK MPs 1837–1841
UK MPs 1841–1847
Tory MPs (pre-1834)
Alumni of St John's College, Cambridge
Conservative Party (UK) MPs for English constituencies
Members of the Parliament of the United Kingdom for constituencies in Cornwall
Planters of Jamaica